Lakić is a surname. Notable people with the surname include:

Dubravka Lakić, Serbian film critic
Jovica Lakić, Serbian footballer
Mara Lakić
Ognjen Lakić
Risto Lakić
Srđan Lakić
Zoran Lakić
Sacha Lakic

Serbian surnames